NG-11, previously known as OA-11, is the twelfth flight of the Northrop Grumman robotic resupply spacecraft Cygnus and its eleventh flight to the International Space Station under the Commercial Resupply Services (CRS-1) contract with NASA. The mission launched on 17 April 2019 at 20:46:07 UTC. This is the last mission from the extended CRS-1 (phase 1) contract; follow-up missions are part of the CRS-2 contract. Cygnus NG-11 was also the first mission to load critical hardware onto Cygnus within the last 24 hours prior to launch, a new Antares feature.

Orbital ATK and NASA jointly developed a new space transportation system to provide commercial cargo resupply services to the International Space Station (ISS). Under the Commercial Orbital Transportation System (COTS) program, then Orbital Sciences designed and built Antares, a medium-class launch vehicle; Cygnus, an advanced maneuvering spacecraft, and a Pressurized Cargo Module which is provided by Orbital's industrial partner Thales Alenia Space. Northrop Grumman purchased Orbital in June 2018; its ATK division was renamed Northrop Grumman Innovation Systems.

Concurrently, Nepalese satellite NepaliSat-1 and Sri Lankan satellite Raavana 1 were launched as part of Cygnus NG-11 as deployable payloads.

History 
Cygnus NG-11 is part of an extension program that enables NASA to cover the ISS resupply needs until the Commercial Resupply Services 2 contract enters in effect. The mission launched on 17 April 2019, at 20:46:07 UTC from Wallops Island, Virginia.

Spacecraft 

Production and integration of Cygnus spacecraft is performed in Dulles, Virginia. The Cygnus service module is mated with the pressurized cargo module at the launch site, and mission operations are conducted from control centers in Dulles, Virginia and Houston, Texas. This will be the eighth flight of the Enhanced-sized Cygnus PCM.

The spacecraft for the NG-11 is named the S.S. Roger Chaffee after Roger Chaffee who lost his life during training for the Apollo 1 mission. On 17 April 2019 at 20:46:07 UTC, Antares launched the NG-11 mission to the International Space Station from Wallops Island, Virginia.

Manifest 

 Crew supplies: 
 Science investigations: 
 Spacewalk equipment: 
 Vehicle hardware: 
 Computer resources: 
 Northrop Grumman-related equipment: 

Smallsats deployed during NG-11:
 AeroCube 10A (JimSat) and 10B (DougSat) by The Aerospace Corporation
 Aeternitas, Ceres, and Libertas, three CubeSats in the Virginia CubeSat Constellation, launched as part of NASA's ELaNa-26 mission, developed by Old Dominion University, Virginia Tech, and the University of Virginia, respectively.
 EntrySat
 IOD-1 GEMS (In-Orbit Demonstration - Global Environmental Monitoring Satellite)
 KRAKsat, a CubeSat created by Polish students from AGH University of Science and Technology and Jagiellonian University
 SASSI2 (Student Aerothermal Spectrometer Satellite of Illinois and Indiana)
 Seeker, a free-flying NASA CubeSat for vehicle inspection
 SpooQy 1
 Światowid, a CubeSat by SatRevolution
 60 × ThinSats in 12 strings, experimental miniature satellites built by school children and university students
 Uguisu, Raavana 1, and NepaliSat-1, 1U CubeSats developed by students in Japan, Sri Lanka, and Nepal, respectively, as part of the BIRDS-3 project

New hardware, known as the Thermal Amine Scrubber, the first Exploration ECLSS Tech Demonstration aboard ISS, which will be activated in April 2019 and scrub additional  from the ISS atmosphere.

See also 
 Uncrewed spaceflights to the International Space Station

References 

Cygnus (spacecraft)
Supply vehicles for the International Space Station
Spacecraft launched in 2019
Spacecraft launched by Antares rockets
Spacecraft which reentered in 2019